"See If I Care" is a song written by Walt Aldridge and Robert Byrne, and recorded by American country music group Shenandoah. It was released in January 1990 as the fifth single from their album The Road Not Taken. The song reached number 6 on the Billboard Hot Country Singles & Tracks chart in May 1990. It also peaked at number 5 on the Canadian RPM Country Tracks chart.

Chart performance

Year-end charts

References

1990 singles
Shenandoah (band) songs
Songs written by Walt Aldridge
Songs written by Robert Byrne (songwriter)
Columbia Records singles
1989 songs